Matías Alexis Romero (born 1 February 1996) is an Argentine professional footballer who plays as a midfielder or right winger for Banfield.

Club career
Romero had a spell with Boca Juniors' youth system, prior to joining Argentinos Juniors. The 2018–19 Argentine Primera División season saw the club promote Romero into their senior squad, with manager Alfredo Berti awarding him his professional debut during an encounter with Gimnasia y Esgrima on 11 August 2018; coming off the bench for Fausto Montero in a 1–0 loss. In July 2019, Romero netted his first goal in a Copa Sudamericana first leg victory against Colón.

In the beginning of January 2022, Romero joined Banfield on a deal until the end of 2024.

International career
Romero represented Argentina at U17 level, winning three caps at the 2013 South American U-17 Championship which Argentina ended as winners.

Career statistics
.

Honours
Argentina U17
South American U-17 Championship: 2013

References

External links

1996 births
Living people
Sportspeople from San Miguel de Tucumán
Argentine footballers
Argentina youth international footballers
Association football midfielders
Association football forwards
Argentine Primera División players
Argentinos Juniors footballers
Club Atlético Banfield footballers